Owen Gruffydd (1643-1730) was a Welsh poet partly noted for a lament on the decline of the Welsh language in the early 18th century.

Not much is known about Owen Gruffydd's early life and career except that he was born in the parish of Llanystumdwy, Caernarfonshire. It is likely that he lived much of his life there and in the outlying parishes. Gruffydd was a weaver by profession. He was, however, known more for his poetic gifts. He also earned a name as a genealogist.

Poems
Gruffydd's poems were mostly composed in honor of the aristocracy living in the surrounding countryside. He wrote such poems in the old Welsh tradition. He also wrote some other types poems which were more popular verse. An example of these were the carols for Christmastide. Selected works of Gruffydd were published in Carolau a Dyriau Duwiol (1688), in Blodeu Gerdd Cymry (1759) and in Gwaith Owen Gruffydd (1904), edited by O. M. Edwards. A large collection of his works is archived in the British Museum and the National Library of Wales.

Later life
Gruffydd gradually lost his sight with old age and he dictated his verse to friends.

References 

17th-century Welsh writers
Welsh male poets
18th-century Welsh writers
18th-century British male writers
Welsh-language poets
1643 births
1730 deaths